Atterbury is a surname. Notable people with the surname include:

Francis Atterbury (1663–1732), English politician and bishop
Grosvenor Atterbury (1869–1956), American architect
John Atterbury, actor
Luffman Atterbury, musician
Malcolm Atterbury, stage and vaudeville actor who was born in Philadelphia
Paul Atterbury, antiques expert and television personality
Septimus Atterbury, early English footballer
William Wallace Atterbury (1866-1935), Brigadier General during World War I

See also
Camp Atterbury, a training base of the Indiana National Guard near Edinburgh, Indiana
Atterbury Air Force Base, a former United States Air Force base near Columbus, Indiana